The 1978 Yugoslavian motorcycle Grand Prix was the thirteenth and final round of the 1978 Grand Prix motorcycle racing season. It took place on 17 September 1978 at the Staza Grobnik Rijeka.

350 cc classification

250 cc classification

125 cc classification

50 cc classification

References

Yugoslav motorcycle Grand Prix
Yugoslavian
Motorcycle Grand Prix
Motorsport in Croatia